The United Nations Special Service Medal (UNSSM) is presented to personnel with 90 days of service with a United Nations mission not covered by a specific United Nations Medal.  United Nations Headquarters service is not eligible.

Eligibility 
The following is an incomplete listing of eligible missions which qualify for the Special Service Medal:
United Nations Office for the Coordination of Humanitarian Affairs (UNOCHA) Peshawar 1989 to 1990
United Nations Mine Awareness and Clearance Training Program in Pakistan and Afghanistan 1989 to 1991
United Nations Special Commission on Iraq (UNSCOM), 180 non-consecutive days may also fulfill service requirement. April 1991 to the present 
Service with United Nations High Commissioner for Refugees (UNHCR) detachments in support of the Sarajevo Airlift or 100 landings in Sarajevo while serving as part of Operation Cheshire (United Kingdom) 1 July 1992 to 12 January 1996 or Operation Airbridge (Canada) 15 February 1992 to 31 March 1995
Cambodian Mine Action Center (CMAC) 17 February 1994 to present
United Nations Assistance Mission in Afghanistan (UNAMA) as part of Operation Accius November 2002 to present
Office of the Special Representative of the Secretary General in West Africa as part of Operation Solitude since 22 March 2003.
United Nations Advance Mission to Sudan (UNAMIS) as part of Operation Safari from July 2004 to 23 March 2005.
United Nations Assistance Mission in Iraq, 2 October 2004 to present
United Nations Department of Humanitarian Affairs Accelerated De-Mining Programme (MADP) in Mozambique 1995 to 2005
United Nations Demining Programme National Institute for the Removal of Obstacles and Explosive Ordnance (INAROE) in Angola 1997-2000
Programme for the Assistance to the Lao National Unexploded Ordnance Programme (UXOL) from 1997 to 2003
United Nations Monitoring, Verification and Inspection Commission (UNMOVIC) in Iraq from 2002 to 2003
United Nations Assistance Mission in Afghanistan (UNAMA) from 2004 to the present
United Nations Assistance Mission for Iraq (UNAMI) from 2005 to the present
United Nations Office in Timor-Leste (UNOTIL) in East Timor from 2005 to 2006
United Nations Mine Action Coordination Centre in Southern Lebanon (UNMACC-SL) from 2007 to 2008

Appearance 
The UN Special Service Medal is a circular bronze medal 35 mm in diameter.  The obverse depicts the official emblem of the United Nations, a world map oriented from the north pole.  Above the emblem are the letters UN.  The reverse is plain except for the words "In the Service of Peace" in relief.  This design is common to the all United Nations Medals starting with the UNTSO Medal and the UNMOGIP Medal and follows the current convention of a common medal design with a varying ribbon.

The ribbon of the UN Special Service Medal is wide stripe of light blue, often referred to as UN Blue, with white edges.

Claps or medal bars are worn on the ribbon of the medal to denote areas of service with the country name where the service took place, or the name of the UN organization involved.  Examples are a "Timor Leste" clasp for service with UNOTIL in East Timor, "Afghanistan" for service with UNAMA in Afghanistan, or "UNSCOM" for service in Iraq.

See also 
 International decoration

References 

Medals of the United Nations